The Kingsport Times News is a daily broadsheet newspaper published in Kingsport, Tennessee, and distributed in six counties in Northeast Tennessee and Southwest Virginia.

The Times News is published by Six Rivers Media, LLC., which publishes one other daily and three weeklies in Northeast Tennessee.

The production facility for all Six Rivers Media products is located at the Times News.

The Kingsport Times News has won Tennessee State Press awards for reporting, editorial writing, photography and design.

History

The Kingsport Times
The first edition of the Kingsport Times was first published on April 27, 1916.

The Kingsport Times News
The newspaper became the Kingsport Times News in 1944.

See also
 List of newspapers in Tennessee

References

External links 
 Kingsport Times News online
 Six Rivers Media

Daily newspapers published in the United States
Kingsport, Tennessee
Newspapers published in Tennessee
Publications established in 1916